Constantin Nicolae (born 1 January 1939) is a Romanian fencer. He competed in the individual and team sabre events at the 1972 Summer Olympics.

References

1939 births
Living people
Romanian male fencers
Romanian sabre fencers
Olympic fencers of Romania
Fencers at the 1972 Summer Olympics
Sportspeople from Bucharest